Huang Xianzhong (born 1947) is a retired general in the People's Liberation Army (PLA) of the People's Republic of China, and the former political commissar of the PLA Shenyang Military Region. 

Huang graduated from the department of missile engineering of the PLA Institute of Military Engineering in Harbin. He was the vice political commissar of the Liaoning provincial military region. In April 1999, Huang was appointed director of the political department of PLA National Defense University. He was elevated to political commissar of the University in January 2003. He was appointed to his present post as political commissar of the Shenyang Military Region in 2005. He attained the rank of lieutenant general in 2004, and general on July 15, 2008. 

Huang was elected as a member of the Commission for Discipline Inspection of the 16th Chinese Communist Party National Congress. He was a member of the 17th Central Committee of the Chinese Communist Party.

References

1947 births
Living people
People from Heze
National University of Defense Technology alumni
People's Liberation Army generals from Shandong
Members of the 17th Central Committee of the Chinese Communist Party
Delegates to the 11th National People's Congress
Members of the Standing Committee of the 12th National People's Congress
Political commissars of the Shenyang Military Region